Wilgyth of Cholsey  was a 6th-century Catholic  female saint from Anglo-Saxon England who was venerated locally in Berkshire.

Provenance
Very little is known of the life of this saint who is known to history through the hagiography of the Secgan Manuscript, and Manuscript R.7.13. held in Trinity College (Cambridge) Library.

Family
She had a (step)brother Bana, founder of a monastery at Le Relecq-Kerhuon in France, and sisters Saints Juthwara and Sidwell, and Eadwara (possibly a nickname of Juthwara) She possibly had other brothers, Paul Aurelian a bishop, Gulval another saint, Pautel and Nautel. If a sister of Paul Aurelian, she would have been the daughter of a Cornish/Welsh chieftain named Perphirius from Penychen in Glamorgan. Legend holds that her mother died while she was quite young and that following the later death of her father, two of her sisters were murdered by her stepmother.

References

Medieval English saints
Southwestern Brythonic saints
Medieval Cornish saints
6th-century Christian saints
6th-century births
Year of birth unknown
Year of death unknown
Female saints of medieval England
6th-century English people
6th-century English women